Watertown is a city in Dodge and Jefferson counties in the U.S. state of Wisconsin. Most of the city's population is in Jefferson County. Division Street, several blocks north of downtown, marks the county line. The population of Watertown was 22,926 at the 2020 census. Of this, 14,674 were in Jefferson County, and 8,252 were in Dodge County. Watertown is the largest city in the Watertown-Fort Atkinson micropolitan area, which also includes Johnson Creek and Jefferson.

History

Origin
Watertown was first settled by Timothy Johnson, who built a cabin on the west side of the Rock River in 1836. He was born in Middleton, Middlesex County, Connecticut, on the 28th of June, 1792. A park on the west side of the city is named in his honor. The area was settled to utilize the power of the Rock River, which falls  in two miles (two  dams). The water power was first used for sawmills, and later prompted the construction of two hydroelectric dams, one downtown (where the river flows south) and one on the eastern edge of the city (where the river flows north).

Watertown was a New England settlement. The original founders of Watertown consisted entirely of settlers from New England, particularly Connecticut, rural Massachusetts, Vermont, New Hampshire and Maine, as well some from upstate New York who were born to parents who had migrated to that region from New England shortly after the American Revolution. These people were "Yankees", that is to say they were descended from the English Puritans who settled New England in the 1600s. They were part of a wave of New England farmers who headed west into what was then the wilds of the Northwest Territory during the early 1800s. Most of them arrived as a result of the completion of the Erie Canal as well as the end of the Black Hawk War. When they arrived in what is now Watertown there was nothing but dense virgin forest and wild prairie, the New Englanders laid out farms, constructed roads, erected government buildings and established post routes. They brought with them many of their Yankee New England values, such as a passion for education, establishing many schools as well as staunch support for abolitionism. They were mostly members of the Congregationalist Church though some were Episcopalian. Due to the second Great Awakening some of them had converted to Methodism and some had become Baptists before moving to what is now Watertown. Watertown, like much of Wisconsin, would be culturally very continuous with early New England culture for most of its early history. It was incorporated as a village in 1849, and chartered as a city in 1853.

In the 1850s, immigrants arrived in Watertown from Germany. Most of the German immigrants who arrived in Watertown brought with them the trappings of the German middle class, including a proclivity for classical music, the Latin language and ornate furniture. Unlike instances in other parts of the country in which they faced discrimination and xenophobia, they were welcomed with open arms by the English-Puritan descended "Yankee" population of Watertown and Jefferson County as a whole. This warm reception led to chain migration, which in turn greatly increased the German population of the region. Culturally they had much in common with the New England derived population. For instance both groups unanimously opposed slavery and both had a pronounced love for commerce and industry. Economically both communities would thrive in Watertown for the entirety of the 19th century, not facing any measurable economic hardships until the Great Depression in the following century.

Milwaukee and Rock River Canal
A canal from Milwaukee to the Watertown area was once planned, but was replaced by railroad before any work had been completed, other than a dam in Milwaukee. The territorial legislature incorporated the Milwaukee and Rock River Canal company in 1836, but the plan was abandoned in 1848. The canal would have provided a waterway between the Great Lakes and the Mississippi River, but even if completed, it may not have seen much success because railroads had already become the preferred mode of transportation.

19th century growth
In 1853, a plank road was completed from Milwaukee to Watertown. After plank roads were no longer used, the route was replaced by highway (Wisconsin Highway 16) and a railroad. A street named "Watertown Plank Road" survives in Milwaukee. It is referred to in the "Plank Road Brewery" family of beers, produced by Miller Brewing Company in Milwaukee.

There was an influx of German immigrants in the late 19th century. The city is the home of the first kindergarten in the United States, started in 1856 by Margarethe Schurz, wife of statesman Carl Schurz; the building that housed this kindergarten is now located on the grounds of the Octagon House Museum in Watertown.

City railroad bond default
Growth of the city was substantially hampered when Watertown issued almost half a million dollars in bonds to support the building of two railroads to town to encourage further growth: the Chicago & Fond du Lac Company and the Milwaukee, Watertown & Madison Road. The success of the plank road convinced residents that a railroad would be even more beneficial, and bonds were issued from 1853 to 1855. The Milwaukee and Watertown Railroad, as it was called before it extended to Madison, was completed in 1855, only the second line in the state.

Soon after, in the Panic of 1857, the two railroads went bankrupt. The bonds were sold by the original investors to out-of-town speculators at a small fraction of their face value. Since the railroads were never built and did not produce revenue, the city was unable to pay off the bonds. Moreover, the city did not feel compelled to do so because the creditors (those who held the bonds) were not only from out of town, but weren't even the original holders. Yet the creditors exerted so much pressure on the city to pay off the bonds that Watertown effectively dissolved its government so that there was no legal entity (the government as a whole or officers) that could be served a court order to pay or appear in court. The case was not resolved until 1889, when it had risen all the way to the Supreme Court of the United States, which essentially dismissed the case of the creditors. A small amount remained to be paid, and this was not paid off until 1905, half a century later.

Geography and climate
Watertown is located in southeastern Wisconsin, approximately midway between Madison and Milwaukee, at 43°12'N 88°43'W (43.193, −88.724). Small communities in the immediate area (e.g., within the school district) include Richwood, Lebanon, Old Lebanon, Sugar Island, Pipersville, Concord, Ebenezer, and Grellton.

The Rock River flows through Watertown in a horseshoe bend before heading south and west on its way to the Mississippi River. The city originally developed inside the horseshoe, though it has long since grown beyond. Silver Creek adjoins the river in the city, as does a short creek on the west side.

The most notable geographical feature is a high density of drumlins, long hills formed by the glaciers of the Wisconsin glaciation as they retreated northwards. Hills in the area are elongated in the north-south direction.

Demographics

2020 census
As of the census of 2020, the population was 22,926. The racial makeup of the city was 87.9% White, 1.2% Black or African American, 0.8% Asian, 0.4% Native American, 3.5% from other races, and 6.2% from two or more races. Ethnically, the population was 9.6% Hispanic or Latino of any race.

2010 census
As of the census of 2010, there were 23,861 people, 9,187 households, and 6,006 families living in the city. The racial makeup of the city was 94.0% White, 0.8% African American, 0.3% Native American, 0.8% Asian, 2.7% from other races, and 1.4% from two or more races. Hispanic or Latino of any race were 7.3% of the population.

There were 9,187 households, of which 33.0% had children under the age of 18 living with them, 50.0% were married couples living together, 10.5% had a female householder with no husband present, 4.8% had a male householder with no wife present, and 34.6% were non-families. 28.6% of all households were made up of individuals, and 13.2% had someone living alone who was 65 years of age or older. The average household size was 2.46 and the average family size was 3.03.

The median age in the city was 35.7 years. 25.7% of residents were under the age of 18; 10.3% were between the ages of 18 and 24; 25.4% were from 25 to 44; 24% were from 45 to 64; and 14.5% were 65 years of age or older. The gender makeup of the city was 48.4% male and 51.6% female.

2000 census
As of the census of 2000, there were 21,598 people, 8,022 households, and 5,567 families living in the city. The population density was 1,974.1 people per square mile (762.3/km2). There were 8,330 housing units at an average density of 761.4 per square mile (294.0/km2). The racial makeup of the city was 95.90% White, 0.25% African American, 0.39% Native American, 0.61% Asian, 0.03% Pacific Islander, 1.69% from other races, and 1.13% from two or more races. Hispanic or Latino of any race were 4.94% of the population.

There were 8,022 households, out of which 34.9% had children under the age of 18 living with them, 56.2% were married couples living together, 9.5% had a female householder with no husband present, and 30.6% were non-families. 25.5% of all households were made up of individuals, and 12.1% had someone living alone who was 65 years of age or older. The average household size was 2.55 and the average family size was 3.07.

In the city, the population was spread out, with 26.0% under the age of 18, 10.3% from 18 to 24, 29.6% from 25 to 44, 19.4% from 45 to 64, and 14.7% who were 65 years of age or older. The median age was 35 years. For every 100 females, there were 93.9 males. For every 100 females age 18 and over, there were 90.0 males.

The median income for a household in the city was $42,562, and the median income for a family was $50,686. Males had a median income of $34,825 versus $23,811 for females. The per capita income for the city was $18,977. About 4.6% of families and 6.7% of the population were below the poverty line, including 7.8% of those under age 18 and 6.9% of those age 65 or over.

Education
Watertown is in the Watertown Unified School District. The city has one public high school, Watertown High School. Riverside Middle School is on the eastern edge of the city. The public elementary schools in the city are: Lincoln, Schurz, Douglas, and Webster. The city also has one charter high school, Endeavor Charter School.

Six parochial schools serve elementary and middle school students in Watertown, four Lutheran and two Catholic. Luther Preparatory School, a school affiliated with the Wisconsin Evangelical Lutheran Synod (WELS), is located in the central city.

Maranatha Baptist University and its associated private high school, Maranatha Baptist Academy, are located on the west side of Watertown. A branch of the Madison Area Technical College is also on the west side.

Business and industry
Watertown's major employers are the school district, Watertown Regional Medical Center, [CQC], several light industries, food processing, metals, electronics, and regional distribution companies.

Rail & Transload, Inc. 
The operations occur mostly within a small rail yard directly connected to the Canadian Pacific mainline. The yard has room for up to 125 freight cars, and the inside facility has room for up to five. These are mostly hoppers and tank cars.

Transportation
Primary automobile transportation is provided via Highways 19, 26 and 16. Highway 19 begins in Watertown and runs westward towards Sun Prairie. Highway 16 runs east-west across Wisconsin from Milwaukee to La Crosse, passing around Watertown via a bypass. Business highway 26 runs north-south through the center of the city, while highway 26 bypasses the town to the west. Highways 26 and 16 provide access to Interstate 94. Highway 16 provides access to the Milwaukee metro area, and highway 19 provides access to the Madison metro area.

Airport
Watertown Municipal Airport (KRYV) provides service for the city and surrounding communities.

Rail 
Amtrak's Empire Builder passenger train passes through, but does not stop in, Watertown. The nearest Amtrak train station is in Columbus, Wisconsin. Freight rail service is provided by the Canadian Pacific Railway (CP), the Union Pacific Railroad (UP), and the Wisconsin and Southern Railroad (WSOR).

Bus/Taxi
The city subsidizes a "Watertown Transit" service that provides taxi and small bus "ride sharing" service between requested stops.

Healthcare 
Watertown Regional Medical Center is a 95 bed hospital with a level III trauma center. There are 35.4 primary care physicians per 100,000 population in the area. Watertown is designated as a mental health Health Professional Shortage Area (HPSA). By 2035, Watertown is estimated to have a 51.6% deficit in primary care physicians, the sixth largest expected deficit in Wisconsin. There are no behavioral health professionals in Watertown.

Media
The local newspaper, the Watertown Daily Times, dates back to November 23, 1895, when John W. Cruger and E. J. Schoolcraft formed a partnership to publish a daily newspaper. The newspaper currently has 25,000 readers.

The radio station WMDX (formerly WTTN), AM 1580, was licensed to Watertown but is now licensed to with the transmitter located west of Columbus, Wisconsin while the studio ultimately moved to Madison where it serves as a news/talk outlet. WJJO 94.1 FM was originally in Watertown, but is now also located in Madison with an active rock format. Watertown is still well served served by radio stations from the Madison, Milwaukee and Janesville markets as well as signals originating from surrounding towns.

Watertown operates a local Government-access television (GATV) channel. Programming includes church services from around the area, as well as special programming, sports, and community events.

Watertown is in the Milwaukee television market with stations from Madison also available over the air and on cable.

Historic landmarks
 Beals and Torrey Shoe Co. Building
 Chicago and North Western Depot
 First Kindergarten
 August and Eliza Fuermann Jr. House
 Octagon House

Notable people

 Charles Beckman, Wisconsin State Representative
 Al Bentzin, guard in National Football League
 R. D. Blumenfeld, journalist, editor of the British Daily Express
 Champ Boettcher, fullback in National Football League
 Daniel Brandenstein, NASA astronaut, veteran of four space shuttle flights
 Ray Busler, player in National Football League
 Luther A. Cole, politician and businessman 
 Joseph E. Davies, second ambassador to represent U.S. in Soviet Union
 William M. Dennis, Wisconsin state legislator
 William Ellis, Medal of Honor recipient
 Edward W. Fehling, Michigan State Senator
 Hezekiah Flinn, Wisconsin State Representative
 Charles R. Gill, Attorney General of Wisconsin
 Hiram Gill, Mayor of Seattle, Washington
 Daniel Hall, Wisconsin State Representative
 C. Hugo Jacobi, Wisconsin State Representative and businessman
 John Jagler, Wisconsin legislator
 Charles A. Kading, Congressman
 Lloyd Kasten, language scholar
 Robert Kastenmeier, Congressman
 John Kessler, Wisconsin State Representative
 Eugene H. Killian, Wisconsin State Representative
 Frederick Kusel, Wisconsin State Senator
 Mary Lasker, health activist, recipient of Presidential Medal of Freedom and Congressional Gold Medal
 John A. Lovely, Minnesota Supreme Court justice
 Vincent R. Mathews, Wisconsin State Representative
 Christian Mayer, Wisconsin State Representative
 Peter McGovern, Minnesota State Senator
 Fred Merkle, nicknamed "Bonehead" was an American first baseman in Major League Baseball for Giants, Dodgers, Cubs
 Charles Mulberger, Wisconsin State Senator and Mayor of Watertown
 Nate Oats, basketball head coach, University of Alabama
 Carlotta Perry, poet
 Ben Peterson, Olympic gold and silver medalist in wrestling
 Judson Prentice, Wisconsin State Senator
 Theodore Prentiss, Wisconsin State Representative
 J. A. O. Preus III, former President of Concordia University, Irvine, California
 Meinhardt Raabe, actor
 Edward Racek, Wisconsin State Representative and Mayor of Watertown
 Randall J. Radtke, Wisconsin State Representative
 Patrick Rogan, Wisconsin State Representative
 Theodore H. Rowell, pharmaceutical industrialist and politician
 John C. Schuman, Wisconsin State Senator
 Carl Schurz, U.S. Secretary of the Interior
 Margarethe Schurz, founder of first kindergarten in U.S.
 Thomas Shinnick, Wisconsin State Representative
 Albert Solliday, Wisconsin State Senator
 Jesse Stone, Lieutenant Governor of Wisconsin
 Doris Tetzlaff, baseball player
 C. F. Viebahn, Wisconsin State Representative
 William Voss, Wisconsin State Senator
 Byron F. Wackett, Wisconsin State Representative
 Myron B. Williams, Wisconsin State Senator
 Joseph Wimmer, Wisconsin State Representative
 Ferdinand T. Yahr, Wisconsin State Senator

References

Further reading 
 Wallman, Charles J. The German-Speaking 48ers: Builders of Watertown, Wisconsin. Madison, WI: University of Wisconsin Press, 1992

External links

 City of Watertown
 Watertown Area Chamber of Commerce
 
 Where Have All the Germans Gone? contains a segment on the history of the German community in Watertown

Cities in Wisconsin
Cities in Jefferson County, Wisconsin
Cities in Dodge County, Wisconsin
Watertown-Fort Atkinson